Bennett Tarlton McCallum (July 27, 1935 - December 28, 2022) was an American monetary economist. He was H. J. Heinz Professor of Economics at Carnegie Mellon University's Tepper School of Business. He is known for the McCallum Rule, a monetary policy proposal advocating targeting the growth rate of the monetary base.

McCallum earned a B.A. and a B.Sc. (in chemical engineering) from Rice University. He then attended Harvard Business School to earn his M.B.A., before returning to Rice in order to obtain his Ph.D. in economics.

He became professor at Carnegie Mellon in 1981, after holding a professorship at the University of Virginia (1974–1982). Among his doctoral students was Charles L. Evans, the current president of the Federal Reserve Bank of Chicago.

See also 

 McCallum rule

References

External links
Website at Carnegie Mellon
https://www.nber.org/people/bennett_mccallum
https://www.c-span.org/person/?bennettmccallum
 

1935 births
Living people
Monetary economists
New classical economists
Rice University alumni
Harvard University alumni
University of Virginia faculty
Carnegie Mellon University faculty
20th-century American economists
21st-century American economists
Fellows of the Econometric Society